The Central District of Alborz County is a district (bakhsh) in Alborz County, Qazvin Province, Iran. At the 2006 census, its population was 94,853, in 24,318 families.  The District has one city: Alvand.   The District has two rural districts (dehestan): Pir Yusefian Rural District, and Nosratabad Rural District.

References 

Districts of Qazvin Province
Alborz County